Elections to City of Bradford Metropolitan District Council were held on 10 June 2004.  The whole council was up for election following boundary changes. The council stayed under no overall control.

Election result

This result had the following consequences for the total number of seats on the council after the elections:

Ward results

By-elections between 2004 and 2006

References

2004
2004 English local elections
2000s in West Yorkshire